Plato is a town and municipality in Magdalena Department in Colombia.

 Area: 1,501 km².
 Elevation: 20 meters
 Population: 66,362
 Rural: 18,625
 Urban: 47,737
 Agricultural products: livestock, corn, beans, tomatoes, yuca, tobacco

Points of interest
 Alligator Man Park
 Statue of Bolivar
 Statue of the Virgin of Carmen

Transports 
The city is served by the Plato Airport

References

External links
Plato official website
 Gobernacion del Magdalena - Plato

Municipalities of Magdalena Department